I ett fotoalbum is a 1998 album by Swedish dansband Lasse Stefanz. The title track was a 1998 Svensktoppen hit.

Track listing
I ett fotoalbum
Är det kärlek du behöver
Jag vill ge dig min morgon
Septemberregn
Gamle gosse
Toma löften, toma ord
Samma sol lyser än
Du är vinden i mitt segel
Bara en lek
Den gamla grinden
Båten till Köpenhamn
Ännu blommar kärleken
Kärlekens sång
Dansa natten lång

Charts

References 

1998 albums
Lasse Stefanz albums